Rudolf Krupitzer (April 18, 1879 – May 2, 1972) was an American gymnast. He competed in four events at the 1904 Summer Olympics.

References

External links
 

1879 births
1972 deaths
American male artistic gymnasts
Olympic gymnasts of the United States
Gymnasts at the 1904 Summer Olympics
Place of birth missing
20th-century American people
Austro-Hungarian emigrants to the United States